Norman Ogilvie "Pompey" Norton (11 May 1881 – 27 June 1968) was a South African cricketer. He was a lawyer by career and became a provincial administrator for the game.

An all-rounder, Norton made his first-class debut with Western Province versus an Australian team in 1902. He returned in 1907 with Border and within two years attained a personal best score of 57 during a game in Cape Town against Western Province. In another game at Cape Town during the 1908/09 season, he took 6 for 34 against Eastern Province, taking 10 for 92 in the match and also making a second and last first-class fifty.

In the 1909/10 season, Norton played in the Fifth Test against the touring English team. He took 4 for 47, including the wickets of Jack Hobbs and Frank Woolley, and scored 2 and 7.

Norton founded the East London law firm of Norton Gale and Kingon. He also served as mayor of East London.

References 

  World Cricketers - A Biographical Dictionary by Christopher Martin-Jenkins published by Oxford University Press (1996),
  The Wisden Book of Test Cricket, Volume 1 (1877–1977) compiled and edited by Bill Frindall published by Headline Book Publishing (1995),

External links
 

1881 births
1968 deaths
Border cricketers
South Africa Test cricketers
South African cricketers
Western Province cricketers
People from Makhanda, Eastern Cape
Cricketers from the Eastern Cape